Franz Adolph of Anhalt-Bernburg-Schaumburg-Hoym (Schaumburg Castle, 7 July 1724 – Halle an der Saale, 22 April 1784), was a German prince of the House of Ascania from the Anhalt-Bernburg branch through the sub-branch of Anhalt-Bernburg-Schaumburg-Hoym.

He was the fourth (but third surviving) son of Victor I Amadeus Adolph, Prince of Anhalt-Bernburg-Schaumburg-Hoym, by his first wife Charlotte Louise, daughter of William Maurice, Count of Isenburg-Büdingen-Birstein.

Life
The death of his elder surviving brother the Hereditary Prince Christian in 1758 made Franz Adolph the heir presumptive of Anhalt-Bernburg-Schaumburg-Hoym, preceded only by his other older brother and new heir, Karl Louis. He retained his position as heir presumptive until the birth of Karl Louis's first son, Victor Karl Frederick, in 1767.

Marriage and issue
In Nieder-Kaufung on 19 October 1762 Franz Adolph married Maria Josepha (b. 13 September 1741 – d. Halle, 2 December 1785), daughter of Count John Wolfgang of Hasslingen, from a Silesian noble family. She was raised to the rank of countess by the Emperor, which prompted Franz Adolph's brothers to ask the Reichshofrat for a declaration that this elevation would not be to their disadvantage in any way (4 September 1766); they were rebuffed (9 January 1767). The union produced seven children, who were considered dynasts:
Victor Frederick (b. Halle, 28 February 1764 – d. Halle, 17 October 1767).
Charlotte Louise (b. Halle, 20 April 1766 – d. Halle, 6 January 1776).
Frederick Franz Christoph (b. Halle, 1 May 1769 – d. Genslack, East Prussia, 19 November 1807); married in Waldau, Kr. Lauban on 22 June 1790 to Johanna Amalia Karoline Westarp (b. Brieg, 24 August 1773 – d. Brieg, 28 July 1818), a commoner, who was ennobled and created Countess of Westarp in 1798. The union was morganatic. The couple had four children who were created with their mother Counts and Countesses of Westarp:
Count Louis Frederick Victor of Westarp (b. Leipzig, 18 May 1791 – d. Freiwaldau, 7 April 1850), married in Potsdam on 10 February 1822 to Franziska von Lavergne-Peguilhen (b. Plock, 2 February 1797 – d. Wiesbaden, 25 November 1867). Their descendants in the male line continue to the present day.
[Count] Frederick Albert [of Westarp] (b. Brieg, 17 October 1792 – d. Brieg, 25 October 1792).
Countess Marie Karoline Adelheid of Westarp (b. Wiesbaden, 16 January 1795 – d. Gandau, 1 August 1811).
Count Karl Victor Adolph of Westarp (b. Grebenstein, 6 April 1796 – d. Hamburg, 4 May 1850); married in Berlin on 23 June 1822 to Baroness Pauline of Müffling (b. Erfurt, 17 November 1803 – d. Potsdam, 15 May 1886). Their descendants in the male line continue to the present day.
Victoria Amalie Ernestine (b. Halle, 11 February 1772 – d. Vienna, 17 October 1817), married firstly on 24 June 1791 to Karl of Hesse-Philippsthal (son of William, Landgrave of Hesse-Philippsthal) and secondly on 16 October 1796 to Count Franz of Wimpffen.
Adolf Karl Albrecht (b. Halle, 14 July 1773 – d. Halle, 7 February 1776).
Leopold Ludwig (b. Halle, 8 January 1775 – d. Halle, 28 January 1776).
Marie Henriette (b. Halle, 10 February 1779 – d. Halle, 12 June 1780).

References

Franz Adolph
1724 births
1784 deaths
Sons of monarchs